St. Petersburg State Institute of Psychology and Social Work (SPbGIPSR) is the only Russian state higher education institution of psychological and social profile in the Northwestern Federal District.

Academic structure
As of December 2017, the Institute consists of Faculty of Psychological and Social Work (since 1995) and Faculty of Applied Psychology (since 1999) with a total of seven departments:
 Theory and Technology of Social Work
 Applied Social Psychology and Conflictology
 General, Developmental and Differential Psychology
 Counseling and Health Psychology
 Psychological Counseling
 Pedagogy and Psychology of Deviant Behaviour
 Philosophy, Cultural Studies and Foreign Languages
 Economics, Mathematics and Informatics

Academic structure also comprises the specialized Training and Laboratory Complex (TLC) designed to facilitate the practice-oriented approach in student's training. TLC consists of 6 laboratories and 4 classes:
: start table with width.

 Art-Workshop Studio
 Center of Computer Technologies
 Psychological Counseling Studio
 Psychological Practice Center
 Psychophysiology Lab
 Music Therapy Studio

 Physical Education Center
 Individual Counseling Class
 Training and Methodology Class on Psychological and Social Work
 Civil Defense Class

Higher Education
Bachelor's degree programmes

 37.03.01 Psychology
 39.03.02 Social Work "Social Work in the System of Social Services"
 37.03.02 Conflictology

Master's degree programmes
 37.04.01 Psychology "Psychological Counseling"
 39.04.02 Social Work "Innovative Practices of Social Work"

All courses are delivered in the Russian language.

Legal status
Institute operates under the university charter and internal regulations. It has license and state accreditation.

See also
 Education in Russia
 List of universities in Russia

References

Universities and colleges in Saint Petersburg